Cerrillos or Los Cerrillos is a very small city in the west part of the Canelones Department of southern Uruguay. 

Cerrillos is also the name of the municipality to which the city belongs. It was created on 15 March 2010 by the Act of Ley Nº 18.653. It comprises the electoral districts CCA and CEB of Canelones department. The localities Campo Militar, Sofía Santos, Las Brujas and Parador Tajes are parts of this municipality.

Geography

Location

History
It was founded on 3 August 1896. On 5 July 1907, its status was elevated to "Pueblo" (village) by the Act of Ley N° 3.188, and on 23 October 1958 to "Villa" by the Act of Ley N° 12.581. Finally, on 20 July 1971, it received the status of "Ciudad" (city) by decree N° Ley 13.990.

Population
In 2011 Cerrillos had a population of 2,508. In 2010, the Intendencia de Canelones estimated a population of 7,369 for the municipality during the elections.

 
Source: Instituto Nacional de Estadística de Uruguay

Places of worship
 Church of St. Michael Archangel (Roman Catholic)

References

External links

 Official website 
 INE map of Cerrillos

Populated places in the Canelones Department